Maryland Route 588 (MD 588) is a state highway in the U.S. state of Maryland.  The state highway runs  from MD 7 in Rosedale north to the end of state maintenance in Overlea.  MD 588 was constructed in the mid-1930s.

Route description

MD 588 begins at an intersection with MD 7 (Philadelphia Road) just west of Interstate 695 (I-695) (Baltimore Beltway) in Rosedale.  Golden Ring Road continues south as a county highway toward U.S. Route 40 on the south side of the intersection.  MD 588 heads north as a two-lane undivided road through residential subdivisions.  At Kenwood Avenue, MD 588 leaves Golden Ring Road and continues north on Kenwood Avenue.  The state highway passes through a commercial area before crossing I-95 with no access.  MD 588 continues north through a residential area of Overlea, passing Overlea High School before reaching its northern terminus just beyond the intersection with Brookwood Avenue.

History
MD 588 was brought into the state highway system when the existing county highway was widened with concrete shoulders and resurfaced with macadam in 1935.  The state highway has changed little since then.

Junction list

See also

References

External links

MDRoads: MD 588

588
Maryland Route 588